Novy Krasnoyar is a rural locality (a selo) and the administrative centre of Krasnoyarsky Selsoviet, Sterlitamaksky District, Bashkortostan, Russia. The population was 473 as of 2010. There are 14 streets.

Geography 
Novy Krasnoyar is located 19 km northeast of Sterlitamak (the district's administrative centre) by road. Taneyevka is the nearest rural locality.

References 

Rural localities in Sterlitamaksky District